John Stuart Western  (16 March 1931 – 6 January 2011) was an Australian academic and author.

He received his B.A. and M.A. and his Diploma of Social Studies from the University of Melbourne, and his Ph.D from Columbia University in 1959. In 1966, along with Colin A. Hughes, he published a study of Australia's first ever televised policy speech on 12 November 1963, by then prime minister Sir Robert Menzies. At this time, Western was a lecturer in Psychology at the Australian National University.

Their study comprised 250 voters who viewed the policy speech, examined the effect of this form of political communication, and traced its impact on the knowledge, attitudes, and opinions of this group. This was the first such detailed study undertaken in Australia, providing a testing of theories of cognitive equilibrium in relation to voting behaviour, and an examination of television's use in political communication.

Western moved to the University of Queensland in 1966 and was appointed Professor of Sociology at the University of Queensland in 1970. He was elected a Fellow of the Academy of the Social Sciences in Australia in 1984. He specialised in the sociology of mass communication, class and inequality, and the professions in Australia.  He also served as a Commissioner on the Queensland Criminal Justice Commission from 1990 until 1994.

Western had two sons, Mark and Bruce, both of whom are sociologists.

Bibliography

References

External links
 Biography - University of Queensland

1931 births
Australian non-fiction writers
2011 deaths
Fellows of the Academy of the Social Sciences in Australia